Dabrava may refer to:

 Dabrava, Blagoevgrad Province, a village in Bulgaria
 Dabrava, Dobrich Province, a village in Bulgaria
 Dabrava, Lovech Province, a village in Bulgaria
 Dabrava Glacier, Antarctica

See also
 
 Dubrava (disambiguation)
 Dabravata, a village in Lovech Province, Bulgaria
 Dabravka, a village in Vidin Province, Bulgaria